The Latin Rhythm Albums chart is a music chart published in Billboard magazine. This data is compiled by Nielsen SoundScan from a sample that includes music stores, music departments at electronics and department stores, internet sales (both physical and digital) and verifiable sales from concert venues in the United States to determine the top-selling Latin rhythm albums in the United States each week. The chart is composed of studio, live, and compilation releases by Latin artists performing in the Latin hip hop, urban, dance and reggaeton, the most popular Latin rhythm music genres.

There were twelve number-one albums in 2007. Puerto Rican performer Ivy Queen's sixth studio album  Sentimiento sold nine thousand copies in its first week, becoming Queen's first album to "invade" the Billboard 200 chart, debuting at number 105. It also debuted atop the Billboard Latin Rhythm Albums chart, giving Queen her first number-one album and led the chart for three weeks in April. Queen became the first and remains the female artist to post a number one on the chart. Puerto Rican band Calle 13's Residente o Visitante debuted on the Billboard 200 at number fifty-two, selling about 12,000 copies in its first week.  The album remained on the Billboard 200 for a total of four weeks. It led the Billboard Latin Rhythm Airplay chart for two weeks in May. Puerto Rican singer Daddy Yankee's El Cartel: The Big Boss led the chart for fourteen weeks in 2007. The album debuted at number nine on the Billboard 200 and at number one on the Billboard Latin Albums chart, selling 82,000 copies in its first week.

Albums

References

Rhythm 2007
United States Latin Rhythm Albums
2007 in Latin music